Mamonia is a village in the Paphos District of Cyprus, located 8 km northeast of Nikokleia.

References

Communities in Paphos District